Jacques Nguyễn Văn Mầu (22 January 1914 – 31 January 2013) was a Vietnamese bishop of the Roman Catholic Church.

Biography
Jacques Mầu was born in Bà Rịa in 1914. He was ordained a priest on 21 September 1940 and served as the Rector of Saint Joseph Major Seminary in Saigon from 1966 to 1968.

He was appointed Bishop of Vĩnh Long by Pope Paul VI, following the resignation of Bishop Antoine Nguyễn Văn Thiện on 12 July 1968. He received his episcopal consecration by Archbishop Angelo Palmas, Apostolic Delegate to Vietnam, on 12 September 1968 at the Saigon Notre-Dame Basilica.

On 3 July 2001, he retired from the diocese of Vĩnh Long, reaching the age of 87. He died on 31 January 2013, aged 99.

See also

References

External links
Profile at Catholic Hierarchy website

20th-century Roman Catholic bishops in Vietnam
1914 births
2013 deaths
People from Bà Rịa-Vũng Tàu Province